Wildness is the seventh studio album by Northern Irish-Scottish rock band Snow Patrol. The album was released on 25 May 2018. It is their first album with Johnny McDaid as a full member of the band, after his involvement as a guest musician and songwriter on Fallen Empires and participation in its tour.

Background and development
In an interview with NME in 2012, Gary Lightbody said that he had to overcome a bout of writer's block and that the songs written for the new album were scrapped before being replaced by new "mind-boggling" material. The follow-up to 2011's Fallen Empires was initially due for release in 2016, and subsequently summer 2017. In late January 2018, the title and release date were officially announced.

Every song in the album has its own music video except for "Heal Me".

Promotion
"Don't Give In" was released as the first single for Wildness on 21 March 2018. "Life on Earth" was released as the second single from the album on 12 April 2018. "What If This Is All the Love You Ever Get?" was released as the third single on 2 May 2018. "Empress" was released as the fourth single on 8 May 2018.

Critical reception

Wildness received generally positive reviews from critics. On the review aggregator website Metacritic, the album has a weighted average score of 64 out of 100 based on 9 reviews, indicating "generally favorable reviews". 

Pitchfork gave the album a score of 4.8 out of 10, calling it "their most personal album" and saying it "deals in matters of literal life and death".

Commercial performance
After an extremely close chart race, the album debuted at number two on the UK Albums Chart on sales of 39,118, less than 1,000 sales behind The Greatest Showman: Original Motion Picture Soundtrack.

Track listing

Personnel 
Snow Patrol
Gary Lightbody – lead vocals, guitar , additional programming , backing vocals 
Nathan Connolly – guitar , backing vocals 
Paul Wilson – bass 
Jonny Quinn – drums 
Johnny McDaid – piano , backing vocals , keyboards , guitar , programming , orchestral arrangement 

Additional personnel
Jacknife Lee – guitar , keyboards , programming , backing vocals , strings arrangement , bass 
Davide Rossi – strings arrangement and strings quartet 
Saran Davies – cello 
Ben Hulme – French horn 
Alexandra Ridout – trumpet , flugelhorn

Charts

Weekly charts

Year-end charts

Certifications

References

2018 albums
Snow Patrol albums
Albums produced by Jacknife Lee